Danilo Pudgar (born 3 May 1952) is a Slovenian former ski jumper who competed from 1971 to 1973 representing Yugoslavia. He earned his best individual career finish of eighth in the individual large hill at the 1972 Winter Olympics in Sapporo.

External links

Ski jumpers at the 1972 Winter Olympics
Living people
Slovenian male ski jumpers
1952 births
Olympic ski jumpers of Yugoslavia
Place of birth missing (living people)